Buruguwada is a village in Y. Ramavaram Mandal, East Godavari district in the state of Andhra Pradesh in India.

Demographics 
 India census, This Village had a population of 173, out of which 92 were male and 81 were female. Population of children below 6 years of age were 12%. The literacy rate of the village is 47%.

References 

Villages in Y. Ramavaram mandal